Henzinger is a surname. Notable people with the surname include:

 Monika Henzinger (born 1966), German computer scientist
 Thomas Henzinger (born 1962), Austrian computer scientist and researcher

See also
 Henninger